Mikalay Dzyemyantsyey (Łacinka: Mikałaj Dzemianciej, Nikolay Dementey; 25 May 1930 – 10 July 2018) was a Soviet and Belarusian politician who was chairman of the Belarusian Supreme Soviet. A former member of the Communist Party of Belarus, he was replaced by Stanislav Shushkevich as chairman because he sided with the leaders of the August 1991 coup attempt against Soviet president Mikhail Gorbachev. He died on 10 July 2018, at the age of 88.

References

1930 births
2018 deaths
People from Chashniki District
Heads of state of the Byelorussian Soviet Socialist Republic
Members of the Central Committee of the Communist Party of Byelorussia
Members of the Supreme Council of Belarus
Recipients of the Order of the Red Banner of Labour
People of the 1991 Soviet coup d'état attempt